Freeden Bank is a submarine bank named for Wilhelm von Freeden, the founder of the Norddeutsche Seewarte, the forerunner of the German Hydrographic Office. The name was proposed by Dr. Heinrich Hinze of the Alfred Wegener Institute for Polar and Marine Research, Bremerhaven, Germany, and was approved by the Advisory Committee for Undersea Features in June 1997.

References

Undersea banks of the Southern Ocean